Från Älvdalen till Nashville is a studio album by Swedish dansband Larz-Kristerz, released on 9 November 2011. For the album, the band was awarded a Grammis award in the "Dansband of the year" category and a Guldklaven Award in the "Album of the Year" category.

Track listing
"Här på landet"
"Dance with Somebody"
"Hjärtat bankar" (duet with Eva Eastwood)
"Vaya con Dios"
"Du lovar och du svär"
"Lögner och porslin"
"I'm Ready"
"1000 frågor, ett svar"
"Paula (flera tusen watt)"
"Highway Patrol"
"Vår gamla opel"
"Hard Luck Woman"
"Du gör mig lycklig"
"Optimisten"
"Good Hearted Woman"
"Du raiter up mig (You Raise Me Up)"

Charts

References 

2011 albums
Larz-Kristerz albums